Anavra is a village and a community of the Agia municipality. The 2011 census recorded 599 inhabitants in the village. The community of Anavra covers an area of 23.244 km2.

Administrative division
The community of Anavra consists of two separate settlements:
Anavra
Prinias

Population
According to the 2011 census, the population of the settlement of Anavra was 599 people, an increase of almost 8% compared with the population of the previous census of 2001.

See also
 List of settlements in the Larissa regional unit

References

Populated places in Larissa (regional unit)